Aedes (Dendroskusea) reginae is a species complex of zoophilic mosquito belonging to the genus Aedes. It is found in Sri Lanka, and India.

References

External links
Dendroskusea Edwards, 1929 - Mosquito Taxonomic Inventory
Tree-Hole Breeding of Aedes aegypti in Southern India: a Preliminary Report

reginae